"Daddy's Gonna Make You a Star!" is the third single from Australian supergroup Company of Strangers. The track was released in January 1993 and peaked at number 35 in March.

At the APRA Music Awards of 1993, the song won Most Performed Australian Work.

Track listings
 CD Single (659001 1)
 "Daddy's Gonna Make You a Star!" - 4:41	
 "Don't Take My Love Away" - 4:18	
 "Wind and Fire" - 3:39

Chart positions

Weekly charts

Cover Versions
 In 2007, James Reyne recorded an acoustic version for his album Ghost Ships.

References

1992 songs
1993 singles
Columbia Records singles
Company of Strangers (band) songs
APRA Award winners
Songs written by Simon Hussey
Songs written by James Reyne